Zhichunli Station is a subway station on Line 10 of the Beijing Subway. It is located between Zhichun Lu (to the east) and Haidian Huangzhuang (to the west), under Zhichun Road. This is an underground station.

Station Layout 
The station has an underground island platform.

Exits 
There are 3 exits, lettered A, B, and D. Exit B is accessible.

Gallery

References

External links

Beijing Subway stations in Haidian District